Sheikh Ali Ismail Yacqub was a Somali politician, who served as the first Minister of Defence of the Somali Republic; he also served as the Deputy Minister of Justice.

Sheikh Ali was an influential member of the Somali National League, the party that dominated the former Somaliland Protectorate's politics. In 1960 he was elected MP from the Burao district representing the Rer Ainanshe, that same year he was appointed as Minister of Defence of the newly formed Somali Republic. The following year he led a delegation to Egypt and was a state guest of President Gamal Abdel Nasser, with whom he discussed military co-operation. In 1961 he ordered cross border raids into Ethiopia that destroyed several of their bases near the border. These skirmishes would later escalate and lead to the 1964 Ethiopian–Somali Border War.

See also
Osman Jama Ali
Hassan Adan Wadadid
Ridwan Hirsi Mohamed

References

1930 births
Living people
Defence Ministers of Somalia
People from Togdheer